Giorgio Zuccoli (17 February 1958 – 27 March 2001) was an Italian yacht racer who competed in the 1988 Summer Olympics and in the 1992 Summer Olympics.

References

1958 births
2001 deaths
Italian male sailors (sport)
Olympic sailors of Italy
Sailors at the 1988 Summer Olympics – Tornado
Sailors at the 1992 Summer Olympics – Tornado
Tornado class world champions
World champions in sailing for Italy